Sigmund or Siegmund may refer to:

People
 Sigmund (given name), list of people with the name Sigmund
 Sigmund Freud, a pioneer of psychoanalysis

Arts and entertainment
Sigmund and the Sea Monsters, American 1970s TV series

Fictional chatacters
 Sigmund (also Siegmund), a hero in Norse mythology
 Siegmund, a focal character in Richard Wagner's Die Walküre''
 Sigmund (comics), Doctor Sigmund, a Dutch comics character

Others
 , a cargo ship in service 1926-29

See also 
 Sigismund (disambiguation)
 Zygmunt, a given name